Chaetodexia is a genus of bristle flies in the family Tachinidae. There are at least four described species of Chaetodexia.

Distribution
Madagascar.

Species
Chaetodexia keiseri Mesnil, 1976
Chaetodexia nigrescens Mesnil, 1976
Chaetodexia pallida Mesnil, 1976
Chaetodexia trilineata Mesnil, 1976

References

Dexiinae
Diptera of Africa
Tachinidae genera